The Governor of Oryol Oblast is the highest official of Oryol Oblast. They head the highest executive body of state power in the region - the Administration of Oryol Oblast.

History
Initially, Oryol Oblast was headed by the head of the regional administration. Since 1993, this was Yegor Stroyev. On 26 February 1996, the post of the head of the administration was changed to the governor's one, with Yegor Stroyev becoming the first governor of the region.

On 16 February 2009, Yegor Stroyev voluntarily left the post of governor. Russian President Dmitry Medvedev accepted his resignation and appointed the interim governor Aleksandr Kozlov (a member of the United Russia party). On the same day, President Medvedev submitted to the Oryol Oblast Council of People's Deputies the candidacy of Kozlov to give him the powers of governor. On 27 February at a meeting of the Oryol Regional Council of People's Deputies, the issue of vesting Alexander Kozlov with the powers of the governor was considered. According to the results of the vote, Kozlov was unanimously approved as the governor of Oryol Oblast. At the end of the meeting, the inauguration ceremony took place. After the end of his term of office, Vadim Potomsky was appointed acting governor for the period before the elections.

On 4 October 2017, Russian President Vladimir Putin signed a decree terminating the powers of the Governor of Oryol Oblast, Vadim Potomsky. He appointed the deputy of the Moscow City Duma Andrey Klychkov as the acting governor of the region.

On 14 September 2018, Andrey Klychkov won the elections for the head of the region, with 83.55 percent of the vote.

Governors of Oryol Oblast

References

External links 
 Oryol Region Governor's page on the region's website 
 List of powers of the governor of the Oryol region on the region's website

 
Oryol Oblast
Politics of Oryol Oblast